Pavement is an American indie rock band that formed in Stockton, California, in 1989. For most of their career, the group consisted of Stephen Malkmus (vocals and guitar), Scott Kannberg (guitar and vocals), Mark Ibold (bass), Steve West (drums) and Bob Nastanovich (percussion and vocals). Initially conceived as a recording project, the band at first avoided press or live performances, while attracting considerable underground attention with their early releases. Gradually evolving into a more polished band, Pavement recorded five full-length albums and ten EPs over the course of their decade-long career, though they disbanded with some acrimony in 1999 as the members moved on to other projects. In 2010, they undertook a well-received reunion tour, with another international tour currently ongoing in 2022 and 2023.

Though only briefly attracting mainstream attention with the single "Cut Your Hair" in 1994, Pavement was a successful indie rock band. Rather than signing with a major label as many of their 1980s forebears had done, they remained signed to independent labels throughout their career, including Flying Nun and Matador. They have often been described as one of the most influential bands to emerge from the American underground in the '90s. Some prominent music critics, such as Robert Christgau and Stephen Thomas Erlewine, called them the best band of the 1990s. They have achieved a cult following.

History

1989–1992: Formation and Slanted and Enchanted 
Pavement formed in Stockton, California, in 1989 as a studio project of guitarists and vocalists Stephen Malkmus and Scott Kannberg, known originally only as "S.M." and "Spiral Stairs". Their debut EPs were the lo-fi releases Slay Tracks: 1933–1969, Demolition Plot J-7, and Perfect Sound Forever. They were recorded at Louder Than You Think, the home studio of Stockton local and former hippie Gary Young who also played drums on the recordings. Upon first hearing the duo's songs, Young was quoted as saying, "this Malkmus idiot is a complete songwriting genius".

During this time the band was often compared to English rock band the Fall. Kannberg stated in a 1992 interview that he preferred Minneapolis rock band the Replacements. The Fall singer Mark E. Smith claimed that Pavement were a "rip-off" and that they did not "have an original idea in their heads"; other members of the Fall have been more positive.

After the release of Slay Tracks, a new drummer, Jason Fawkes, was drafted to replace Young. However, after just one tour and a handful of recording sessions, when it became apparent that Fawkes and Malkmus did not get along, Young was reinstated. Malkmus later described Fawkes as "this depressed guy who might assassinate me one day... He's very competitive." Around the same time, Bob Nastanovich was incorporated into the live Pavement band as an auxiliary percussionist. Malkmus had been roommates with Nastanovich in New York City.

Pavement's first performance was on December 14, 1989, on their local college radio station KDVS-FM in Davis, with Malkmus, Kannberg, and Fawkes. In 1990, Pavement embarked on their first tour, with a third guitarist, Rob Chamberlin, who left to join a band called Sugartime before Ibold joined the group.

British indie rock band the Wedding Present covered the Slay Tracks song "Box Elder" after their bassist discovered the album during a trip to the United States. As Pavement were still unknown at the time, people erroneously grew to believe that Pavement's original recording was the cover. The Wedding Present frontman David Gedge gave a Pavement EP to John Peel, who quickly became one of Pavement's biggest fans.

Around 1992, Pavement became a full-time band, with Malkmus, Kannberg, Young, Nastanovich, and bassist Mark Ibold, who had been one of the band's earliest fans. Their debut album, Slanted and Enchanted, was released commercially in 1992 after copies had been circulated on cassette tape for nearly a year. Though the percussive influence of the Fall was still pervasive, as was that of English post-punk band Swell Maps, many of the songs also exhibited a strong sense of melody. Since its release Slanted and Enchanted has appeared on many critics' best-of lists and is frequently cited as being among the most influential indie rock albums of the 1990s. It is listed on Rolling Stone's 500 Greatest Albums of All Time. Later the same year, the band released the EP Watery, Domestic.

1993–1994: Crooked Rain, Crooked Rain 
During the Slanted & Enchanted tour, Gary Young's behavior became more eccentric; he would hand out cabbage and mashed potatoes to fans at the door of the venue, perform handstands, drunkenly fall off his drum stool, and run around the venue while the band was playing. The band only understood how severe Young's drinking problem was after Pavement's first few tours. Malkmus later told Tape Op, "We knew that he was like a hippie and kinda flaky, but we didn't know he had such a bad drinking problem. We found out on that tour, because he really got sick from being nervous... That's why I let Bob be in the band...'Keep the beat going if Gary passes out.'" In 1993, Malkmus unsuccessfully attempted to record some songs at Young's studio. He later said, "We kind of wanted to not record with him anymore, but we were too nice to fire people or even really talk about it... We tried to record there, but it wasn't sounding good and he didn't have his studio ready and he was also in a drinking funk."

At the conclusion of a 1993 tour of Australia, Japan, and Europe, the group held a meeting in a hotel room in Copenhagen. Malkmus, Kannberg, and Ibold remained silent while Nastanovich, Young's best friend at the time, argued with Young. Young agreed to leave the band. He was replaced by Steve West, who had been a fellow museum security guard at the Whitney Museum of American Art along with Malkmus and David Berman. West's debut performance was in 1993 at a Drag City festival in Chicago. Also that year, the band contributed to the AIDS-Benefit Album No Alternative produced by the Red Hot Organization with their song "Unseen Power of the Picket Fence".

Pavement's second album Crooked Rain, Crooked Rain was released in 1994. The record was more indebted to the classic rock tradition than their debut. The single "Cut Your Hair" was the most successful song, and briefly enjoyed airplay on alternative rock radio and MTV. Pavement performed the song on The Tonight Show with Jay Leno. Additionally, the video aired on "Career Day", a season five episode of Beavis and Butt-head, who termed it "buttwipe music" and also wanted the band to "try harder." The song was also featured briefly in the movie A Very Brady Sequel. Like its predecessor, the album received widespread acclaim, including being listed on Rolling Stone magazine's list of the 500 greatest albums of all time.

The lyrics from another single from the album, "Range Life", criticized alternative rock stars the Smashing Pumpkins and the Stone Temple Pilots. Malkmus has insisted over the years that the line is meant to be light-hearted and is sung from the point of view of the aging hippie character in the song. Later live versions of the track had Malkmus substituting "the Spice Girls", "Counting Crows", or others for "Stone Temple Pilots". In response, Smashing Pumpkins leader Billy Corgan threatened to drop his band from their slot headlining the 1994 Lollapalooza Festival if Pavement was allowed to play. Corgan and Malkmus traded barbs in the press for several years afterwards.

1995–1997: Wowee Zowee and Brighten the Corners 
The next album, Wowee Zowee, recorded in Memphis and released April 11, 1995, covered a wide range of styles including punk, country and balladry across its 18 tracks, which often avoided conventional song structures. On the Slow Century DVD, Malkmus attributed his odd choice of singles to his marijuana smoking, stating that "I was smoking a lot of grass back then but to me they sounded like hits." Although Malkmus has said in recent interviews that the album is the last "classic Pavement record," Kannberg has voiced regrets about Wowee Zowee. "We made some mistakes on that record... we were kind of pressured into putting out a record a little faster than we were ready to. I mean, I'm totally into the record. It's just if we had another six months to think about it, it would've been much different."

During the tour for the album, Nastanovich stated on the Slow Century DVD, the band would often not work out a setlist before shows, opting for drug and alcohol fueled jams over hit singles. Some of these shows were held during the 1995 Lollapallooza festival, where the incoherent performances received a hostile reaction from many audiences. Footage from Slow Century shows the band being pelted with mud and rocks. The band left the stage immediately and dubbed themselves "The Band That Ruined Lollapallooza."

Wowee Zowee was followed up by the EP Pacific Trim, which was recorded with only Malkmus and drummers Nastanovich and Steve West. Their studio time was originally reserved for a Silver Jews recording, but frontman David Berman walked out in frustration and the trio decided not to waste prepaid recording time.

Brighten the Corners, released in 1997 and produced by Mitch Easter, was a shorter, more conventional record than Wowee Zowee. Malkmus said on the Slow Century DVD that the album was an attempt to show audiences that Pavement had more mainstream and classic rock influences than it had previously portrayed. The album contained two of the band's best known singles in "Stereo" and "Shady Lane". It was the only Pavement album to include a lyric sheet except Slanted and Enchanted and sold better than its predecessors. Despite increased success, the band continued to fragment, with its members focusing more on other musical projects or on raising families.

1998–2000: Terror Twilight and breakup 
In 1998, Pavement began work on their final album, Terror Twilight. The band originally planned to self-produce Terror Twilight, renting out Jackpot! Studios in Portland, Oregon. The group stalled though, with Malkmus, Ibold, Nastanovich, and Jackpot! employee and future Jicks bassist Joanna Bolme usually opting to play Scrabble over getting any sort of work accomplished. Kannberg was especially frustrated over the sessions, particularly at Malkmus's refusal to include any of Kannberg's songs on the album. Fan favorite "For Sale: The Preston School of Industry" and one other song penned by Kannberg were briefly worked on during the sessions, but abandoned.

Nigel Godrich, known for his work with Radiohead and Beck, was hired to produce. He wanted to make an album that "stood up straighter" and would "reach people who were turned off by the beautiful sloppiness of other Pavement records". The group began work in Sonic Youth's studio in lower Manhattan, New York. Godrich found the studio limiting, so they moved to RPM Studios near Washington Square Park. According to Nastanovich, Godrich struggled with the band's casual approach, and called for more takes than they were used to. Though Nastanovich said Godrich took on a "substantial challenge" and "did a good job", he felt he only connected with Malkmus and disregarded the other band members; Nastanovich realized after several days that Godrich did not know his name. Kannberg was unhappy that Malkmus was not interested in working on songs Kannberg had written, and said it was the hardest Pavement record to make.

Pavement released one last EP, Major Leagues. It features three Malkmus songs, two original Spiral Stairs songs and two covers, "The Killing Moon" by Echo & the Bunnymen and "The Classical" by the Fall. Pavement embarked on a six-month world tour for Terror Twilight, during which time relationships within the group frayed, especially between Malkmus and the other members. After their show at the 1999 Coachella Festival, Malkmus told his bandmates he did not want to continue. During the final concert of the tour, at Brixton Academy in London on November 20, 1999, Malkmus had a pair of handcuffs attached to his microphone stand and told the audience: "These symbolize what it's like being in a band all these years." About two weeks later, a spokesperson for their record label told NME that Pavement had "retired for the foreseeable future".

In mid-2000, Malkmus called Kannberg and told him, "You need to change the website to say we aren't a band any more. People keep asking me if we're breaking up and you know we're not a band any more, right?" Kannberg told Malkmus that he needed to call the other members of the band to inform them that the band was finally breaking up, but Malkmus refused and Kannberg was left with the task of informing them. West said he had never received any call about the breakup from anyone in the band, and discovered that Pavement had dissolved via the internet. Nastanovich later said "there was too much exhaustion for heavy emotion".

2010: First reunion 

On September 15, 2009, Brooklyn Vegan reported that Pavement were scheduled to perform multiple benefit show dates in New York City's Central Park from September 21, 2010. Official statements by the band, label, venue and promoter were released on September 17, 2009, confirming the reunion. The announcement included one concert in Central Park and the promise of a tour, but said that the reunion may only be a one-off event. It said, "Please be advised this tour is not a prelude to additional jaunts and/or a permanent reunion." Tickets for the first Central Park concert sold out in two minutes, leading to the announcement of three more shows at the same venue. The band later confirmed a world-wide tour which started in Auckland, New Zealand, on March 1 at the Auckland Town Hall, before heading on to Australia then heading to the UK, including the All Tomorrow's Parties festival in Minehead, Somerset (May 14 – 16) and several European shows. They also performed at the Coachella Valley Music and Arts Festival in April 2010, the Sasquatch! and Primavera Sound Festivals in May, the Toronto Island Concert in June with Broken Social Scene, Band Of Horses, and others, Open'er Festival, Roskilde Festival and Les Ardentes and Pitchfork Music Festival in July.

The band released a "best-of" compilation album in March 2010, entitled Quarantine the Past: The Best of Pavement. On June 24, 2010, Pavement performed at the Bob Hope Theatre in Stockton, their first-ever hometown show. Original drummer Gary Young joined the band for an encore, playing three songs from Slanted and Enchanted. Young also joined the band during six songs the next night at The Greek Theater in Berkeley.

In September 2010, Pavement appeared on The Colbert Report and Late Night with Jimmy Fallon. After concluding their proper US tour at the Hollywood Bowl on September 30, the band played the following night in Las Vegas at the Palms Casino as a part of the Matador At 21 festival. During their set, Scott Kannberg kicked his monitor and smashed his guitar into his amp in frustration of not being able to hear himself while performing. NME noted the band had an "icy atmosphere onstage". The band honored a further two South American show commitments in November 2010.

Kannberg joined Malkmus and the Jicks onstage at the El Rey Theater in Los Angeles on March 28, 2014, for an encore performance of the Pavement song "Stereo". On October 1 and 2, 2016, Malkmus and the Jicks performed at Spiral Stairs' 50th birthday celebration at the Chapel in San Francisco. On the first night, Kannberg joined Malkmus and the Jicks for four songs. The following night, Kannberg played three more songs with the group, joined by Gary Young on the final two.

2022–: Second reunion 
On June 1, 2019, Pavement announced that they would reunite to perform two 30th-anniversary shows at the 2020 Primavera Sound festivals in Barcelona and Porto. Due to the COVID-19 pandemic, the festival was cancelled, and their performances were rescheduled and announced as part of Primavera Sound's June 2021 lineup. In March 2021, the festival was delayed to 2022. In September 2021, Pavement announced a European tour for late 2022, their first in 12 years, and announced a North American leg on November 2, 2021. On May 23rd, 2022, the band played their first show since 2010 for a sold-out crowd at the Fonda Theatre in Los Angeles. In June, the band played two performances for Primavera Sound 2022 in Barcelona and Porto, respectively.

For the tour, Pavement were joined by the keyboardist and backing vocalist Rebecca Cole, a former member of the Minders and Wild Flag. Nastanovich said Cole gave them more versatility and allowed them to play songs they had not performed live before.

As a prelude to their tour, Pavement worked with the bakery Rudy's Strudel and the Current Year Records and Tapes in Parma, Ohio, to come up with five flavors of pierogi based on their albums. Pavement did not rule out playing new songs, but said they were not interested in recording.

The Parma for Pavement International Committee held an induction ceremony at Parma's Schnitz Ale Brewery on August 19, 2022, where Nastanovich and the Current Year's Michael Stutz played records at a benefit show for Parma seniors. The event, considered one of the most unique music events in the Cleveland area in memory, raised thousands for charity, and was the inaugural event for the Parma for Pavement organization, whose stated goal is to have the band play an open-air show at Byers Field, a local high school football stadium where bands like Peter Frampton played in the early 1970s.

The band began their North American tour at the Balboa Theater on September 7, 2022, followed by concerts across 12 US states and Canada, ending at Austin City Limits, Texas on October 11. On October 17, the band began their European tour at the O2 Academy Leeds, England, which included touring the countries of England, Scotland, France, Denmark, Norway, Sweden, Germany, Belgium, Netherlands, and Ireland. The final European tour was at Vicar Street in Dublin, Ireland, on November 11.

The band has announced plans to perform concerts in Japan, Australia, and New Zealand for 2023. On the subject of new material, Kannberg noted: "You can never say. We can all still play, you know? We sound-checked most nights on this tour and when we got together, we jammed a lot. We didn’t really make up new songs, but we made the old ones a little different, a little jammier and spacier. So, that was fun. You never know. It could be one time we get offered to do something and we all say, 'Let’s try something out.'" The band has scheduled additional shows in Salt Lake City and Reykjavik, Iceland for 2023.

Musical style 
Pavement is credited for defining the modern "indie" sound and was a large presence in 1990s "slacker culture". Malkmus' humorous and often cryptic lyrical themes were a key factor in gaining their cult following. Malkmus rarely wrote ballads or love songs and only a small portion of their discography contained personal reflections or similar lyrical themes, most satirical or laced with sarcasm.

Pavement was also noted for having no designated rhythm and lead guitar player. Malkmus and Kannberg switched roles frequently although Malkmus played lead for the majority of their career. The band was also noted for their use of a foil, or a 'hype-man' usually present in hip hop groups. Bob Nastanovich filled the role although he has detested the term himself. Nastanovich also served as a second drummer during their live performances and served as lead vocalist on select songs that required screaming to prevent strain on Malkmus' voice.

Influences 
Early in their career, Pavement were influenced by the Fall. Influences cited by Kannberg include the Replacements and Swell Maps.

The band has also listed Sonic Youth, Echo & the Bunnymen, and R.E.M. as direct influences. Pavement would reference R.E.M. in the song "Unseen Power of The Picket Fence" featured on the compilation No Alternative and covered "Camera" which appeared as a B-side on the single of "Cut Your Hair." They have also covered Echo & the Bunnymen's "The Killing Moon" on the Major Leagues EP.

Other media 
In 2002, Slow Century, a documentary by Lance Bangs coupled with all of the band's music videos, was released as a 2 DVD set. Included was extensive footage, both professionally shot and taped by fans on camcorders, from the band's earliest shows in 1989 forward. The three final songs from the band's final concert ("Stop Breathin'", "Conduit for Sale" and "Here") are presented at the end of the documentary. Also on the DVD is a hidden easter egg clip from the same show, wherein Malkmus talks about how the handcuffs attached to his microphone stand "represent what it's like being in a band all these years." A bonus disc with a complete concert in Seattle, Washington, from the early part of the Terror Twilight tour was included on the second disc, as well as several songs from their penultimate show.

2004 saw the publication of Perfect Sound Forever: The Story of Pavement, a biography on the band written by Rob Jovanovic. Reviews for the book were mixed, with some saying that it contained much of the same information as the Slow Century DVD and expanded very little on it, while others called it a "fond retrospection".

Slanted! Enchanted! A Pavement Musical, a play consisting of songs from the Pavement discography and following a Stephen Malkmus–like protagonist, opened with a limited run off-broadway in December 2022.

Appearances
The band appeared in a 1997 episode of Space Ghost Coast to Coast, titled "Pavement", where they were mistaken for The Beatles and played two songs done exclusively for the show. These songs were later included on the deluxe re-issue of Brighten the Corners.

Cut Your Hair was featured as downloadable content for Guitar Hero 5.

Band members
Current members
Stephen Malkmus – lead and backing vocals, guitar 
Scott “Spiral Stairs” Kannberg – guitar, backing and lead vocals , bass , keyboards 
Mark Ibold – bass guitar, backing vocals 
Bob Nastanovich – percussion, synthesizers, backing and lead vocals 
Steve West – drums, percussion 

Current touring musicians
Rebecca Cole – keyboards, percussion, backing vocals 

Former members
Gary Young – drums 
 Jason Fawkes – drums (1989)

Former touring musicians

 Rob Chamberlin – guitar 

Timeline

Discography

Studio albums
 Slanted and Enchanted (1992)
 Crooked Rain, Crooked Rain (1994)
 Wowee Zowee (1995)
 Brighten the Corners (1997)
 Terror Twilight (1999)

References

Bibliography
Jovanovic, Rob (2004). Perfect Sound Forever: The Story of Pavement. (Boston) Justin, Charles & Co. .

External links
 Pavement at Matador Records
 Pavement at Domino Recording Company
 
 Podcast of Pavement Live at the Great American Music Hall
 Stephen Malkmus on Reissue of Pavement's 'Brighten the Corners'
 Podcast: Pavement Reunion Tour Concert, Sydney, Australia

Arts & Crafts Productions artists
Alternative rock groups from California
Domino Recording Company artists
Drag City (record label) artists
Flying Nun Records artists
Indie rock musical groups from California
Matador Records artists
Musical groups established in 1989
Musical groups disestablished in 1999
Musical groups reestablished in 2010
Musical groups disestablished in 2010
Lo-fi music groups
Pony Canyon artists
1989 establishments in California